A graphical user interface builder (or GUI builder), also known as GUI designer or sometimes RAD IDE, is a software development tool that simplifies the creation of GUIs by allowing the designer to arrange  graphical control elements (often called widgets) using a drag-and-drop WYSIWYG editor. Without a GUI builder, a GUI must be built by manually specifying each widget's parameters in source-code, with no visual feedback until the program is run. Such tools usually called the term RAD IDE.

User interfaces are commonly programmed using an event-driven architecture, so GUI builders also simplify creating event-driven code. This supporting code connects software widgets with the outgoing and incoming events that trigger the functions providing the application logic.

Some graphical user interface builders automatically generate all the source code for a graphical control element. Others, like Interface Builder or Glade Interface Designer, generate serialized object instances that are then loaded by the application.

List of GUI builders

C Language Based
GTK / Glade Interface Designer
XForms (toolkit) fdesign
Intrinsics
Motif

C# Based
 UWP / Windows Presentation Foundation / WinForms
 Microsoft  Visual Studio XAML Editor, XAML based GUI layout
 Microsoft Expression Blend
 SharpDevelop
 Xamarin.Forms / .NET Core
  Xamarin Studio

C++ Based
 UWP / Windows Presentation Foundation / WinForms
 Microsoft  Visual Studio XAML Editor, XAML based GUI layout
 Microsoft Blend
 Qt (toolkit)
 Qt Creator
 FLTK
 FLUID
 wxWidgets
 wxGlade
 wxFormBuilder
 wxCrafter (plugin for CodeLite)
 Projucer
 Ultimate++

Objective-C / Swift Based
 Cocoa (modern) and Carbon (deprecated).
 Xcode
 GNUstep (formerly OpenStep)
Gorm

Java-Based
Android Studio, XML based GUI layout
NetBeans GUI design tool
SceneBuilder

HTML/Javascript Based
DreamWeaver from Adobe (Web Application User Interface Builders) — Obsolete as of 2022
Apache Cordova / PhoneGap

Object Pascal Based
Delphi / VCL (Visual Component Library)
Lazarus / LCL (Lazarus Component Library)

Flutter Framework Based 
 Flutter (software)
 FlutterFlow,
 FlutterStudio,
 Nowa App builder,
 Blup - Visual Flutter app builder

Tk Framework Based
 Tk (framework) 
 ActiveState Komodo (No longer has a GUI builder)

Visual Basic Based
 UWP / Windows Presentation Foundation / WinForms
 Microsoft  Visual Studio XAML Editor, XAML based GUI layout
 Microsoft Expression Blend

Misc
Adobe Animate
App Inventor for Android
AutoIt
Axure RP
Interface Builder
Crank AMETEK Storyboard
Creately
Embedded Wizard
GEM
Resource construction set
Stetic
LucidChart
OpenWindows
Scaleform
Wavemaker

List of development environments

IDEs with GUI builders (RAD IDEs)
 4D
 ActiveState Komodo (No longer has a GUI builder)
 Android Studio
 Anjuta
 AutoIt3
 B4X
 C++Builder
 Crank AMETEK Storyboard
 Clarion
 Code::Blocks
 CodeLite
 dBase
 Delphi
 Embedded Wizard
 Eclipse
 Gambas
 IntelliJ IDEA
 JDeveloper
 KDevelop
 LabWindows/CVI
 LANSA
 Lazarus
 Liberty BASIC
 Microsoft Visual Studio
 MonoDevelop
 MSEide+MSEgui
 MyEclipse
 NetBeans
 OutSystems
 PascalABC.NET
 Purebasic
 Qt Creator
 SharpDevelop
 Softwell Maker
 VisualFBEditor
 WinFBE
 Xcode
 Xojo

See also 
 Rapid application development
 Human interface guidelines
 Human interface device
 User interface markup language
 User interface modeling
 Design-Oriented Programming
 Linux on the desktop

References

Graphical control elements
Graphical user interfaces